Pakhmutov (Russian: Пахмутов) is a Russian masculine surname originating from the given name Pakhmut, its feminine counterpart is Pakhmutova. The surname may refer to 
Aleksandra Pakhmutova (born 1929), Russian composer
1889 Pakhmutova, an asteroid named after Aleksandra Pakhmutova

References

Russian-language surnames